Mary Julie Isphording (born December 5, 1961, in Cincinnati, Ohio) is a retired female long-distance runner from the United States. She competed for her native country at the 1984 Summer Olympics in Los Angeles, California. However, she did not reach the finish line there.  Isphording set her personal best in the classic distance (2:30:54) in 1989.
 Bobbi Gibb, the first woman to have run the entire Boston Marathon, sculpted the 12-inch bronze figurines of a pony-tailed girl running that were given as trophies to Joan Benoit Samuelson, Julie Brown (athlete), and Isphording, the top three women marathoners at the US Olympic trials in 1984.

Achievements

See also
 World Fit

References

 

1961 births
Living people
American female long-distance runners
Olympic track and field athletes of the United States
Athletes (track and field) at the 1984 Summer Olympics
Track and field athletes from Cincinnati
21st-century American women